Eduardo Balderas (14 September 1907 – 6 January 1989) was the leading translator of scripture and other works for the Church of Jesus Christ of Latter-day Saints (LDS Church) into Spanish. He served as the church's chief Spanish translator for almost 50 years. Along with Rey Pratt, Balderas was also most responsible for translating the church's hymns into Spanish. He was also involved in the first ever translation of the endowment ceremony.

Birth and youth
Balderas was born in Mexico City to José Apolinar Balderas Carranco and María Centeno Guerrero. His family moved to Torreón, México when he was a young child. They later moved to El Paso, Texas. It was in El Paso in 1918 that the family joined the LDS Church.

Balderas served as a missionary for the LDS Church in Arizona and California from 1929 to 1931. He then worked in a lumber yard in Ciudad Juárez and also evenings doing translation work for the LDS Church's mission office in El Paso, the headquarters of the Spanish-American Mission. As part of this later work, Balderas began assisting Antoine R. Ivins in translating the Doctrine and Covenants into Spanish in 1934.  He had previously worked with Pratt on a new translation of the Book of Mormon into Spanish.

Courtship and marriage
At about this time, Balderas met a missionary named Rhea Ross. Rhea was the daughter of Milton H. Ross, a teacher of penmanship at LDS High School in Salt Lake City. She had been born in Payson, Utah but raised in Salt Lake City. She had been serving as a missionary in Los Angeles before being transferred to El Paso and had sought out occasion to meet Balderas since she had heard him praised as a great teacher and speaker by members in Los Angeles. Rhea first met Balderas when he was at work in a lumber yard, dirty from his tough manual labor, and wondered if this man covered with sweat was the great missionary she had heard of, but later on hearing him speak in church meetings she fully knew it was true.

After Ross returned to Salt Lake at the end of her mission, she and Balderas continued to correspond. They were eventually married in the Mesa Arizona Temple on 10 October 1935. After that, they settled in El Paso. He continued working in the lumber yard and as a part-time translator for the Mexican American Mission.

Balderas and Rhea were the parents of two girls and three boys.

Full-time translation service
In 1939, Balderas took a job as a full-time translator for the church and moved to Salt Lake City. Here he continued to work on the Spanish translation of the Doctrine and Covenants, a project not completed until 1948. Balderas remained a full-time translator until 1977 when he officially retired, but then immediately became a volunteer translator. As such he worked on the 1980 Spanish edition of the triple combination.

Balderas worked under the direction of Stephen L Richards and Gordon B. Hinckley, with them giving him guidance and direction on what to translate, but the review of his translation work was done by Ivins.

Translation projects
At the same time Balderas had completed the translation of the Pearl of Great Price into Spanish on his own; this was completed under church assignment, but he was the only person on the project. In 1939, Balderas became the first person employed full-time by the LDS Church as a translator. He also worked on the first translation of the temple endowment ceremony into a language other than English, specifically Spanish, in cooperation with Ivins. In 1961, Balderas helped Marion G. Romney improve his abilities in Spanish so he could more effectively function as the area supervisor for the church in Mexico. Balderas was still working as a translator for the church in 1974, also giving lessons on how to use the Liahona magazine in a church lesson.

In addition to this, Balderas translated into Spanish A Marvelous Work and a Wonder by LeGrand Richards; The Miracle of Forgiveness by Spencer W. Kimball; The Articles of Faith, Jesus the Christ, and The House of the Lord by James E. Talmage; Teachings of the Prophet Joseph Smith, Essentials in Church History by Joseph Fielding Smith; and Gospel Doctrine by Joseph F. Smith.

Balderas also was involved in continuing revisions of the Spanish edition of the Book of Mormon. He created a new edition in 1949, and supervised the new editions in 1969 and 1980.

Other services to the LDS Church
Besides his work as a translator, Balderas also wrote articles in English for church publications about the translation process and also about the success of the Spanish-language sessions at the Mesa Arizona Temple. He wrote an article on translating the scriptures into Spanish that was published in the Ensign in September 1972. The previous month, Balderas had served as church president Harold B. Lee's interpreter at the church's Mexico Area Conference. Balderas also wrote "A Brief History of the Mexican Mission, 1874-1936" which was published in the Spanish Liahona in August 1956.

Among his other church assignments were service as a stake patriarch and as a sealer in the Salt Lake Temple. While a stake patriarch he also had special authorization to give patriarchal blessings to Spanish-speaking members no matter where they lived. He served as an officiator in the Mesa Arizona Temple as well, helping there during excursions of Spanish-speaking Latter-day Saints. It was while in Arizona to assist with the Spanish-language temple sessions that Balderas gave most of his Spanish-language patriarchal blessings.

Notes

References
 Church News, 1941-05-24, p. 5.
 Gordon B. Hinckley, "Salt of the earth...", Church News, 1947-10-25.

External links
 May 25, 1972 Deseret News announcement of Balderas's son Samuel R. Balderas's marriage

1907 births
1989 deaths
Converts to Mormonism
Mexican leaders of the Church of Jesus Christ of Latter-day Saints
Latter Day Saints from Texas
Latter Day Saints from Utah
Mexican emigrants to the United States
Patriarchs (LDS Church)
People from Mexico City
English–Spanish translators
Translators of the Book of Mormon
American translators
20th-century translators